The 1924 Iowa Senate elections took place as part of the biennial 1924 United States elections. Iowa voters elected state senators in 29 of the senate's 50 districts. State senators serve four-year terms in the Iowa Senate.

A statewide map of the 50 state Senate districts in the 1924 elections is provided by the Iowa General Assembly here.

The primary election on June 2, 1924, determined which candidates appeared on the November 4, 1924 general election ballot.

Following the previous election, Republicans had control of the Iowa Senate with 47 seats to Democrats' 3 seats. A special election in district 37 in 1923 saw the seat flip from Republican to Democratic control.

To claim control of the chamber from Republicans, the Democrats needed to net 22 Senate seats.

Republicans maintained control of the Iowa State Senate following the 1924 general election with the balance of power shifting to Republicans holding 45 seats and Democrats having 5 seats (a net gain of 1 seat for Democrats). In 1925, Senator Schmedika of the 37th district would switch his political party affiliation from Democrat to Independent.

Summary of Results
Note: 21 districts with holdover Senators not up for re-election are not listed on this table.

Source:

Detailed Results
NOTE: The 21 districts that did not hold elections in 1924 are not listed here.

Note: If a district does not list a primary, then that district did not have a competitive primary (i.e., there may have only been one candidate file for that district).

District 2

District 3

District 4

District 5

District 6

District 8

District 11

District 14

District 15

District 16

District 17

District 19

District 23

District 24

District 25

District 26

District 27

District 28

District 31

District 32

District 33

District 36

District 39

District 40

District 41

District 43

District 46

District 47

District 49

See also
 United States elections, 1924
 United States House of Representatives elections in Iowa, 1924
 Elections in Iowa

References

1924 Iowa elections
Iowa Senate
Iowa Senate elections